Plaesius is a genus of clown beetles belonging to the family Histeridae.

Species
 Plaesius acutidens
 Plaesius asperimargo
 Plaesius bengalensis
 Plaesius bisinuatus
 Plaesius edentulus
 Plaesius ellipticus
 Plaesius hamatus
 Plaesius javanus
 Plaesius laevigatus
 Plaesius laevis
 Plaesius mohouti
 Plaesius planulus
 Plaesius pudicus
 Plaesius ruptistrius
 Plaesius striatipectus

References

Histeridae
Staphyliniformia genera
Taxa named by Wilhelm Ferdinand Erichson